Javier Bayon (Barcelona, July 20, 1980) is a Spanish film music composer. He has scored for prestigious directors as Icíar Bollaín, Juanjo Giménez Peña, Kike Maíllo and Darren Lynn Bousman. As an orchestrator has worked for composers as Ludovico Einaudi, Javier Navarrete and Pharrell Williams. He took top honors at the 5th International Film Music Competition 2016, which took place within the framework of the 12th Zurich Film Festival at the Tonhalle Zürich. Bayon won the Golden Eye for Best International Film Music

Selected filmography 
 2019 - Te quiero, imbécil - Directed by Laura Mañá, starring Quim Gutiérrez and Ernesto Alterio
2018 – Welcome to Acapulco – co composed with Luc Suarez, starring Michael Madsen and Paul Sorvino
 2017 – Dorien ( TVE1 series) – starring Macarena Gómez, Eduardo Casanova, Dafne Fernandez
 2017 – Cuánto. Más allá del dinero – Directed by Kike Maíllo
 2016 – Nightworld (orchestrator) – Composed by Luc Suarez, starring Robert Englund
 2016 – Timecode (orchestrator) – Directed by Juanjo Giménez Peña
 2014 – Angelus – Directed by Darren Lynn Bousman
 2014 – L'Altra frontera (orchestrator) starring Ariadna Gil
 2013 – World of Red Bull (documental – orquestrating for Pharrell Williams)
 2012 – Hoodwink
 2004 – Cowboy de mediodía – starring Carlos Lucas

Awards 

 Festival de Cine de Sitges 2015 New Visions Award  / Best Original Score
 Zurich Film Festival Golden Eye 2016 / Best International Film Music
 European Cinematography Awards 2017 Jury Prize  / Best Original Score
 Huetor Vega Short Film Festival 2015 / Best Music
 Los Angeles Film Awards 2017 LAFA Award / Best Score
 MedFF- Mediterranean Film Festival 2017 MedFF / Best Music Score
 Film Composer challenge award 2017 / Achievement in Film composing
 Sonar + D / 2016 Best Proposal
 American track music awards 2017 / Best Soundtrack
 Die Seriale Festival 2019 / Nomination Best Soundtrack
 JGA Jerry Goldsmith Awards 2016 / Nomination Best Music for advertisement
 Silver Screen FilmFest 2017  / Nomination Best Original Score
 Hope Film awards 2017  / Nomination Best Soundtrack
 AURORA International Film Festival 2017  / Nomination Best Music score
 Utah Film Festival and awards 2017  / Nomination Best Original Score

References

External links 
 
 

1980 births
Living people
Spanish film score composers
Male film score composers
Spanish male musicians